"Aft", in nautical terminology, is an adjective or adverb meaning towards the stern (rear) of the ship, aircraft or spacecraft, when the frame of reference is within the ship, headed at the fore. For example, "Able Seaman Smith; lie aft!" or "What's happening aft?".

The corresponding adjective in distinguishing one feature of the vessel from another is "after". Its antonym is "forward".

The corresponding preposition is "abaft". For example, the mizzenmast is abaft the mainmast. Its antonym is "before" or, in a more clumsy form, "forward of".

The stern is opposite the bow, the outside (offboard) of the front of the boat.

The term derives from the Old English æftan (“behind”).

See also 

 Port and starboard

References

Nautical terminology